Gunnar Biörck (4 April 1916 – 28 October 1996) was a Swedish physician, a specialist in cardiology, professor of medicine, personal physician for the Swedish Royal family, and member of the Riksdag (the Swedish parliament).

He was born in Gothenburg to Wilhelm Biörck and Lizzie Petterson, and was married to Margareta Lundberg in 1944. He was appointed professor of medicine at the Karolinska Institute from 1958. He was elected to the Riksdag in 1976, representing the Moderate Party, and stayed as a member until 1987. He died in October 1996.

References

1916 births
1996 deaths
Politicians from Gothenburg
Swedish cardiologists
Members of the Riksdag from the Moderate Party
Members of the Riksdag 1976–1979
Members of the Riksdag 1979–1982
Members of the Riksdag 1982–1985
Members of the Riksdag 1985–1988
20th-century Swedish physicians
Physicians from Gothenburg